Dorothy Fane may refer to:

 Dorothy Montagu, Countess of Sandwich (1716/7–1797), British aristocrat
 Dorothy Fane (actress) (1889–1976), British actress